Lawrence Samuel Molyneaux (July 8, 1912 – May 24, 1966) was a Canadian professional ice hockey player who played 45 games in the National Hockey League for the New York Rangers during the 1937–38 and 1938–39 seasons. The rest of his career, which lasted from 1932 to 1941, was spent in the minor leagues. He was born in Sutton West, Ontario. He died in 1966 in Toronto, Ontario.

Career statistics

Regular season and playoffs

References

External links
 

1912 births
1966 deaths
Canadian ice hockey defencemen
Cleveland Barons (1937–1973) players
Ice hockey people from Ontario
Newmarket Redmen players
New Haven Eagles players
New York Rangers players
People from the Regional Municipality of York
Philadelphia Ramblers players
Pittsburgh Hornets players
Quebec Castors players
Springfield Indians players